The Best Thing I Ever Made is an American cooking television series that aired on Food Network. It featured a rotating lineup of chefs demonstrating how to prepare their favorite recipes. The series is a spin-off of The Best Thing I Ever Ate.

The Best Thing I Ever Made officially premiered on October 16, 2011 and concluded on February 10, 2013, after three seasons. In 2013, the series won a Daytime Emmy Award (along with fellow Food Network series Trisha's Southern Kitchen) for Outstanding Culinary Program.

Episodes

Season 1

Season 2

Season 3

Notes

References

External links
 
 

2010s American cooking television series
2011 American television series debuts
2013 American television series endings
American television spin-offs
Daytime Emmy Award for Outstanding Culinary Program winners
English-language television shows
Food Network original programming
Food reality television series
Reality television spin-offs
Television series by Authentic Entertainment